Sharon Green (6 July 1942 – 17 February 2022) was an American science fiction, fantasy, mystery, and romance author.

Biography 
Green was born in Brooklyn, New York in 1942 to Morris Green and Esther (née Bender) Green. She attended high school in Brooklyn and graduated with a B.A. degree from New York University in 1963.

Green married in 1963 and had three sons. In 1976, Green divorced her husband and raised her three sons, Andy, Brian and Curtis, as a single mother in Highland Park, New Jersey.

Green moved to Tennessee in 1993 and then to Florida in 2006. She moved to Old Bridge, New Jersey in 2020.

Green died at the Roosevelt Care Center on Thursday, February 17, 2022.

Career 
Green began writing in high school. She styled her early writings after her favorite writer, Robert A. Heinlein.

Before becoming a full-time author, she worked in several industries including as an AT&T shareowner correspondent, a construction assistant, then a bar steel assistant sales manager at an import firm.

Green began her full time writing career in 1984. Her early works were marketed as similar to John Norman's Gor series, but were actually intended as a rebuttal to Gor. Green said that she set out first to lampoon Norman's Gor books by creating three-dimensional female characters and powerful female characters in similar fantasy settings. Throughout her career she focused on writing strong female characters.

Published works
This is a selected list of Green's published works.

Her website  reissued some of her older out-of-print books and released several new unissued eBooks series.

The Blending series 

 Convergence: Book One of The Blending, Avon, November 1996
 Competitions: Book Two of The Blending, Avon, March 1997
 Challenges: Book Three of The Blending, Avon, May 1998
 Betrayals: Book Four of The Blending, Avon, February 1999
 Prophecy: Book Five of The Blending, Avon, July 1999

The Blending Enthroned series 
Intrigues: Book One of The Blending Enthroned, Eos, October 3, 2000
Deceptions: Book Two of The Blending Enthroned, April 3, 2001
Destiny: Book Three of The Blending Enthroned, Eos, April 2, 2002

Diana Santee, Spaceways Agent series 
Science fiction series with later sequels released directly on Green's website.

 Mind Guest, DAW Books, 1984 (re-released online)
 Gateway to Xanadu, DAW Books, 1985 (re-released online with newly restored scenes)

Online Sequels 

 Tanderon
 Tristesse Book One
 Tristesse Book Two
 Esmonia
 Xanthia
 Aysanne
 Tildor, CF Publications, 2008
 Restin, CF Publications, 2008
 Absar, CF Publications, 2008
 Gralling
 Durell

Far Side of Forever series 
Fantasy series

 The Far Side of Forever, DAW Books, 1987
 Hellhound Magic, DAW Books, 1989

Hidden Realms series 
Fantasy series

 The Hidden Realms, Avon, 1993
 Game's End, Avon, April, 1996

Also part of Silver Princess, Golden Knight series:

 Dark Mirror, Dark Dreams, Avon, 1994

Jalav: Amazon Warrior series 
Science fiction series
The Crystals of Mida, DAW Books, 1982
An Oath to Mida, DAW Books, 1983
Chosen of Mida, DAW Books, 1984
The Will of the Gods, DAW Books, 1985
To Battle the Gods, DAW Books, 1986

Lady Blade, Lord Fighter series 
Fantasy series released as a collection in 2001.

 Lady Blade, Lord Fighter (or The Silver Bracers), DAW Books, 1987 (online out-of-print reissue)
The Argent Swords, Bereshith Publishing, 2001 (online out-of-print reissue)

Lady Blade, Lord Fighter, Bereshith Publishing, 2001 (hardbound collector's edition)

Lawman series 
Direct-to-eBook releases through Green's website.

 Lawman
 Lawman2

Mind Warriors series 
Terrilian series sequels (direct-to-eBook releases through Green's website)

 Arrival
 Enemies
 Battles
 Tactics
 War
 Peace
 Serenity
 Onward

Silver Princess, Golden Knight series 
Fantasy series

 Silver Princess, Golden Knight, Avon, 1993 (out-of-print novel reissued online)
 Wind Whispers, Shadow Shouts, Avon, July 1995

Also part of Hidden Realms series:

 Dark Mirror, Dark Dreams, Avon, 1994

Taz/Bell series 
Direct-to-eBook releases through Green's website.

 Dead Heat
 Dark Horse
 Down and Dirty
 Down and Dirty Part 2
 Double Trouble

Terrilian series 
Science fiction series

 The Warrior Within, DAW Books, 1982 (out-of-print novel reissued online)
 The Warrior Enchained, DAW Books, 1983 (out-of-print novel reissued online)
 The Warrior Rearmed, DAW Books, 1984 (out-of-print novel reissued online)
 The Warrior Challenged, DAW Books, 1986 (out-of-print novel reissued online)
 The Warrior Victorious, DAW Books, 1987 (out-of-print novel reissued online)

The Thief and the Warrior series 
Science fiction series

 Mists of the Ages, DAW Books, 1988

Standalone novels

Short stories

References

External links
Author website (2012 archive) 
eBooks Order Site

20th-century American novelists
21st-century American novelists
American science fiction writers
American women short story writers
American women novelists
1942 births
Living people
Women science fiction and fantasy writers
20th-century American women writers
21st-century American women writers
20th-century American short story writers
21st-century American short story writers